The Bay Theatre is a single-screen movie theater in Seal Beach, California, United States. It is best known for its screenings of foreign and independent films, and for its revival screenings. The Bay Theatre is also home to a Wurlitzer organ, which is used for concerts and silent film screenings.

History
The Bay Theatre was originally constructed in 1947. At one time, it was a Fox West Coast theater. Richard Loderhose purchased the theater in 1975.

After removing some of the seats, Loderhose installed a 1928-built Wurlitzer organ that he had purchased in the early 1960s from New York City's Paramount Theater. Designed by organist Jesse Crawford, the 21 rank instrument had originally been installed in the Paramount Building's radio studio (the Paramount's auditorium organ is now in the Century II Exhibition Hall, which is located in Wichita, Kansas). The studio organ was used not only for broadcasts but for making recordings. Loderhouse acquired the organ in 1960 and installed it in his Long Island house. He moved it to the Bay Theatre in 1975. He expanded the organ from its original 21 ranks to 54 ranks. It was called the largest Wurlitzer pipe organ in any operating theater in the world at that time.

With the death of its owner, the organ has been removed and the future of the building in uncertain.  The organ itself has been moved to Phoenix, AZ where it will be reinstalled in a public venue for performance, and religious services. The building has been closed since August 2012 and is for sale.

The Seal Beach City Council designated the theater as a historical landmark in September 2016.

The theater is mentioned in an unauthorized biography of Steven Spielberg as being his favorite place to see foreign movies while he was enrolled at nearby Cal State Long Beach in the mid-1960s.

Restoration
According to the HGTV show House Hunters Renovation that aired on November 10, 2018, Bay Theater has been purchased by Paul Dunlap, a real estate investor and Nikki his fiancée. The property was purchased for $2.125 million, including upstairs living space.

The episode featured the living space which was completed. However, the theater restoration is still on going. The renovation budget is $2 million.

References

Further reading

External links
Bay Theatre official website

Cinemas and movie theaters in California
Buildings and structures in Orange County, California
Theatres completed in 1947
1947 establishments in California